The Pireneus State Park (also called the Parque Estadual da Serra dos Pireneus), erroneously spelled "Pirineus", is a state park in the state of Goiás, Brazil. It protects an area of cerrado that includes the highest peak in the region, the  Pico dos Pireneus, on the watershed between the Plata and Tocantins river basins

Location

The Pireneus State Park is in the municipalities of Pirenópolis, Cocalzinho de Goiás and Corumbá de Goiás in the state of Goiás.

There are dozens of small springs that feed the das Almas River in the Tocantins basin and the Corumbá River in the Plata basin.
There is a small chapel dedicated to the Holy Trinity at its summit.
Its slopes define the edge of the Central Plateau of Brazil, and it forms the divide between the Plata and Tocantins river basins.

Environment

The Pireneus State Park is classed as IUCN protected area category II (national park).
The objectives are preservation of natural ecosystems of great ecological relevance and scenic beauty while enabling scientific research, education, environmental interpretation, recreation in contact with nature and ecological tourism. The park preserves the flora, fauna and water sources.
The park is in the cerrado biome.
The park holds cerrado rupestre vegetation, which grows on rocks and includes endemic species of cacti, orchids and bromeliads.
There are also forests, grasslands and other types of cerrado vegetation.

History

A group of scientists who were demarcating the quadrilateral of the federal district of Brasília measured the altitude and coordinates of the Pico dos Pireneus on 8 August 1892.
A small wooden chapel was erected on the peak in 1927, and the first mass was held on 18 June 1927 attended by 35 people.
The chapel was destroyed by a gale in 1935 and a masonry chapel built the same year, which still stands.

The Pireneus State Park was created by law 10.321 of 20 November 1987 in the municipality of Pirenópolis, covering the area of the Picos de Pirineus, its mountains and slopes.
Law 13.121 of 16 July 1997 altered the wording to include the municipalities of Corumbá and Cocalzinho de Goiás.
The park protects one of the highest ranges in the State of Goiás, the Serra dos Pireneus.
It is administered by the Secretariat of Environment and Water Resources (SEMARH) of Goiás.

Visiting
As of 2016 the park did not have a management plan, and there was no control over visits.
The park is open from 8am to 5pm, or from 9am to 8pm during daylight saving time.
Domestic animals are not allowed.
Hunting, fishing, fires and the use of alcohol are prohibited, and visitors must not collect specimens of flora, fauna or rocks, or cause any damage to the environment.
A local guide is advisable although not required, since there are no signposts or marked trails to the most attractive parts of the park.

Notes

Sources

State parks of Brazil
Protected areas established in 1987
1987 establishments in Brazil
Protected areas of Goiás